The Liberal Democratic Party of Russia currently has 21 members in the 8th convocation of the State Duma, the lower house of the Federal Assembly, the Russian parliament. The party was led by Vladimir Zhirinovsky until his death on 6 April 2022.

8th Convocation members
A total of 21 members of the party were elected to the 8th State Duma in the 2021 Russian legislative election. 19 members were elected from the party list, with a further 2 candidates returned through election victories in single-mandate constituencies. The elected members took up their mandates at the first meeting of the 8th State Duma, on 12 October 2021.

Elected on the party list

Elected in single-mandate constituencies

Former members

7th Convocation members 
 Andrei Valeryevich Andreichenko (Андрей Валерьевич Андрейченко)
 Kirill Igorevich Cherkasov (Кирилл Игоревич Черкасов)
 Boris Aleksandrovich Chernyshov (Борис Александрович Чернышов)
 Mikhail Vladimirovich Degtyaryov (Михаил Владимирович Дегтярёв)
 Vadim Yevgenyevich Dengin (Вадим Евгеньевич Деньгин)
 Aleksei Nikolayevich Didenko (Алексей Николаевич Диденко)
 Sergei Ivanovich Furgal (Сергей Иванович Фургал)
 Sergei Vladimirovich Ivanov (Сергей Владимирович Иванов)
 Sergei Genrikhovich Karginov (Сергей Генрихович Каргинов)
 Sergei Mikhailovich Katasonov (Сергей Михайлович Катасонов)
 Vasilina Vasilyevna Kuliyeva (Василина Васильевна Кулиева)
 Aleksandr Borisovich Kurdyumov (Александр Борисович Курдюмов)
 Andrei Albertovich Kuzmin (Андрей Альбертович Кузьмин)
 Oleg Leonidovich Lavrov (Олег Леонидович Лавров)
 Igor Vladimirovich Lebedev (Игорь Владимирович Лебедев)
 Andrei Konstantinovich Lugovoi (Андрей Константинович Луговой)
 Sergei Vladimirovich Marinin (Сергей Владимирович Маринин)
 Anton Yuryevich Morozov (Антон Юрьевич Морозов)
 Yury Aisovich Napso (Юрий Аисович Напсо)
 Sergei Vasilyevich Natarov (Сергей Васильевич Натаров)
 Yaroslav Yevgenyevich Nilov (Ярослав Евгеньевич Нилов)
 Boris Romanovich Paikin (Борис Романович Пайкин)
 Vitaly Lvovich Pashin (Виталий Львович Пашин)
 Dmitry Ivanovich Savelyev (Дмитрий Иванович Савельев)
 Valery Sergeyevich Seleznev (Валерий Сергеевич Селезнёв)
 Aleksandr Nikolayevich Sherin (Александр Николаевич Шерин)
 Danil Yevgenyevich Shilkov (Данил Евгеньевич Шилков)
 Pavel Valentinovich Shperov (Павел Валентинович Шперов)
 Leonid Eduardovich Slutsky (Леонид Эдуардович Слуцкий)
 Aleksandr Sergeyevich Starovoitov (Александр Сергеевич Старовойтов)
 Yelena Viktorovna Strokova (Елена Викторовна Строкова)
 Ivan Konstantinovich Sukharev (Иван Константинович Сухарев)
 Andrei Nikolayevich Svintsov (Андрей Николаевич Свинцов)
 Dmitry Aleksandrovich Svishchyov (Дмитрий Александрович Свищёв)
 Vladimir Vladimirovich Sysoyev (Владимир Владимирович Сысоев)
 Igor Andreyevich Toroshchin (Игорь Андреевич Торощин)
 Vasily Maksimovich Vlasov (Василий Максимович Власов)
 Yury Gennadyevich Volkov (Юрий Геннадьевич Волков)
 Sergei Aleksandrovich Zhigarev (Сергей Александрович Жигарев)
 Vladimir Volfovich Zhirinovsky (Владимир Вольфович Жириновский)

External links
 List of State Duma deputies

References

 
List